Manfred Tiedtke (born 7 September 1942) is a German athlete. He competed in the men's decathlon at the 1968 Summer Olympics.

References

External links
 

1942 births
Living people
Athletes (track and field) at the 1968 Summer Olympics
German decathletes
Olympic athletes of East Germany
Athletes from Berlin